Sturgeon River may refer to:

In Canada 
Sturgeon River (Alberta), which flows into the North Saskatchewan River northeast of Fort Saskatchewan
Sturgeon River (Manitoba) in northern Manitoba and Ontario
In Ontario:
Sturgeon River in northern Kenora District in the Hayes River watershed, same as Sturgeon River (Manitoba).
Sturgeon River (Kenora District), in western Kenora District in the Nelson River watershed, tributary of the English River
Sturgeon River (Marchington River tributary) in eastern Kenora and north-western Thunder Bay Districts, tributary of Marchington River in the Nelson River watershed
Sturgeon River (Black Bay Peninsula) on the Black Bay Peninsula in Lake Superior, Thunder Bay District
Sturgeon River (Lake Nipissing), in the Nipissing, Sudbury and Timiskaming Districts, which flows to Lake Nipissing
Sturgeon River (Simcoe County), in Simcoe County, which flows to Georgian Bay on Lake Huron
Sturgeon River (Prince Edward Island) in Kings County, Prince Edward Island
Sturgeon River (Saskatchewan), which flows into the North Saskatchewan River just west of Prince Albert, Saskatchewan
Sturgeon-Weir River, a river in Saskatchewan

In the United States 
Sturgeon River (Michigan), four rivers in Michigan
Sturgeon River (Big Fork River), located in Koochiching County, Minnesota
Sturgeon River (Little Fork River), located in St. Louis County, Minnesota
Sturgeon River, Minnesota, an unorganized territory in St. Louis County, Minnesota

See also 
Black Sturgeon River (Kenora District), Ontario, Canada
Black Sturgeon River (Thunder Bay District), Ontario
Little Sturgeon River, Michigan
Turgeon River (disambiguation)